Mesusera Bugimbi  was an Anglican bishop who served in Uganda: he was the inaugural  Bishop of Luweero, serving from 1991 to 1996.

References

20th-century Anglican bishops in Uganda
Anglican bishops of Luweero
Uganda Christian University alumni